The 2002 Alabama gubernatorial election was held on November 5. The race pitted incumbent Governor Don Siegelman, a Democrat, against Representative Bob Riley, a Republican, and Libertarian nominee John Sophocleus. As of 2023, this is the last time the Governor’s office in Alabama changed partisan control.

The result was an extremely narrow victory for Riley. The certified results showed Riley with 672,225 votes to Siegelman's 669,105, a difference of 3,120 votes, or 0.23% of the 1,367,053 votes cast. Sophocleus garnered 23,272 votes, and 2,451 votes were for write-in candidates. The close and controversial election was marked by high turnout.

Primaries
Both of the principal contestants in the general election campaign faced primary-election opponents whose opposition turned out to be less than expected.  The primaries were held on June 4, 2002.

Democratic Party

Candidates
Charles Bishop, Commissioner of Agriculture and Industries
Blake W. Harper III, businessman
Gladys Riddle, member of the Alabama Board of Pardons and Paroles
Don Siegelman, incumbent Governor
Mark "Rodeo Clown" Townsend

Results

Republican Party

Candidates
Tim James, businessman and son of former Governor Fob James
Bob Riley, U.S. Representative
Steve Windom, Lieutenant Governor

Results

Campaign
The closeness of the general election contest was reflected in its intensity and fervor. At one point in the campaign, a clash erupted between the two principal campaigns over disclosure of the identities of large contributors to the Riley campaign. President George W. Bush appeared in Alabama at a July event, and a private reception with a $50,000 admission was held to benefit the Riley campaign. Riley's campaign initially refused to identify the donors attending the event.  Later, under pressure from the Siegelman campaign, Riley called on the national Republican Party, which had hosted the event, to release the names of donors.  The Riley campaign was subjected to editorial criticism when the voluminous reports released made it difficult to trace the sources of donations from the event to Riley.

During the campaign, actor and National Rifle Association president Charlton Heston came to Alabama to campaign for Republican congressional candidates. While in the state, Heston released a written statement endorsing Siegelman, despite the fact that Riley had made a point of being seen in public with Heston.  Spokesmen for both Riley and the Alabama Republican Party issued statements insinuating that Siegelman had taken advantage of Heston's recently diagnosed Alzheimer's disease to secure the endorsement. After a firestorm of criticism from the NRA and editorial pages, the Republican spokesmen apologized to Heston, but not to Siegelman.

Riley received the endorsements of The Birmingham News, the Mobile Press-Register, the Business Council of Alabama, and the Auburn University Trustee Improvement PAC, an alumni group which opposed Siegelman's choices for trustees at the school (Siegleman re-appointed controversial trustee Bobby Lowder, notorious for constant interference in the university's affairs). In addition to the NRA, Siegelman was endorsed by The Montgomery Advertiser, The Anniston Star, The Tuscaloosa News, and various labor groups, including the Alabama State Employees Association. Siegelman was also endorsed by Alabama Education Association executive secretary Paul Hubbert, although the Association itself remained officially neutral.

The campaign set new spending records for an Alabama gubernatorial race. Even before the final weeks of the campaign, the candidates had raised over $17,000,000.  Riley, who raised and spent over twice the sum Siegelman raised, was primarily backed by business groups and insurance companies.  Siegelman received substantial contributions from labor groups and affiliates of the Alabama Education Association. Both candidates were the beneficiaries of national party funding, and contributions from political action committees made donations to both candidates difficult to trace.

Polls taken in the final days of the campaign reflected the eventual close outcome.

Predictions

Results

Results by congressional district
Despite winning 4 out of 7 congressional districts, Riley lost his old district by around 7% after it was redistricted to become more Democratic.

Aftermath
Riley's victory was controversial, and caused many commentators to recall the Florida election recount of 2000.  Initial returns showed Riley narrowly losing to Siegelman.  Siegelman gave a victory speech on election night, and the Associated Press initially declared him the winner.  However, officials in Baldwin County conducted a recount and retabulation of that county's votes after midnight, and after Democratic Party observers had gone home for the night.  Approximately 6,000 votes initially credited to Siegelman were either removed from the total or reassigned to Riley in the recount, turning the statewide result in Riley's favor. Local Republican officials claimed the earlier returns were the result of a "computer glitch."   Democratic requests to repeat the recount with Democratic observers present were rejected by Alabama courts and then-Attorney General Bill Pryor.  Siegelman and his supporters complained that these judges (and Pryor) were either elected as Republicans or appointed by Republican presidents.  After over a week of fights in courtrooms and in the media, Siegelman, on November 18, 2002,  made a televised address, saying that, "I've decided that a prolonged election controversy would hurt Alabama, would hurt the very people that we worked so hard to help", and abandoned his efforts to secure a recount of the Baldwin County vote, allowing Riley to take office.

In response to the allegation of a "computer glitch", Siegelman later stated: "[N]ow one would expect that if there was some kind of computer glitch or some kind of computer programming error, that it might have affected more than one race, but it further raised suspicions about vote stealing when the votes came back and they were certified, and the only person who lost votes was Don Siegelman, the Democrat, and the only person who gained votes was Bob Riley, the Republican."

A number of analyses of the competing claims were undertaken at the time, with conflicting results.  In one such study, Auburn University political scientist James H. Gundlach concluded that a detailed analysis of the returns, compared with 1998 results and returns from undisputed counties, "strongly suggests a systematic manipulation of the voting results." The Gundlach study also suggested a mechanism by which this could have been effected, and proposed a conclusion that Siegelman won.  An earlier analysis reported by the Associated Press, using a less sophisticated comparison of gubernatorial and legislative returns, was claimed to indicate that the revised returns were more accurate, and that Riley probably won.  The Gundlach paper offers a refutation of the conclusions of the Associated Press study.

Largely as a result of this controversy, the Alabama Legislature later amended the election code to provide for automatic, supervised recounts in close races.  Riley took office January 20, 2003.

References 

Note on references: Many of the sources cited above (as added in May 2008) are not available from free online sources.  The Birmingham News, the Mobile Press-Register, The Montgomery Advertiser, and The Anniston Star have online archives on a fee basis.  The Birmingham and Mobile newspaper archives may be accessed via www.al.com, while archives of The Anniston Star can be accessed at www.annistonstar.com.  Archived articles of The Montgomery Advertiser may be purchased at www.montgomeryadvertiser.com  Archived articles from all of these newspapers are also available to subscribers, or on a per-document fee basis, on Westlaw and Lexis-Nexis.

External links
2002 Election information at sos.state.al.us
Certified election results at sos.state.al.us

See also

Alabama
2002
Gubernatorial